Alessio Ezequiel Naim Ham (born 10 March 1994) is an Argentine professional footballer who plays as a midfielder for Club Olimpo.

Career
Ham was promoted into the first-team of Argentine Primera División side Argentinos Juniors in March 2014 and subsequently made his professional debut on 28 March versus Belgrano. Another appearance followed in 2013–14 against River Plate. His first senior goal came on 22 August 2015 in the Primera División against San Lorenzo. He scored again four games later in a match with Boca Juniors on 19 September 2015, but was later subbed off after breaking his leg following a challenge with Carlos Tevez. After 610 days out, Ham made his return in a Primera B Nacional draw with Almagro on 22 May 2017.

In January 2018, Ham completed a loan move to Japan to join J2 League team FC Gifu. He belatedly made his first appearance on 23 September versus Tokyo Verdy. He departed the club on 23 November. Upon returning to Argentinos Juniors, Ham suffered another serious injury after rupturing his cruciate knee ligaments in a reserve match with Vélez Sarsfield. After recovering, Ham left on loan in February 2020 to Primera B Nacional's Santamarina. He debuted on 15 February versus Deportivo Riestra, prior to a second appearance against Defensores de Belgrano a month later; though the season was soon curtailed.

In October 2020, Ham joined Olimpo of Torneo Federal A on a free transfer.

Career statistics
.

Honours
Argentinos Juniors
Primera B Nacional: 2016–17

References

External links

1994 births
Living people
Footballers from Buenos Aires
Argentine footballers
Association football midfielders
Argentine expatriate footballers
Expatriate footballers in Japan
Argentine expatriate sportspeople in Japan
Argentine Primera División players
Primera Nacional players
J2 League players
Argentinos Juniors footballers
FC Gifu players
Club y Biblioteca Ramón Santamarina footballers
Olimpo footballers